Richland Township is one of twelve townships in Jay County, Indiana, United States. As of the 2010 census, its population was 4,518 and it contained 2,130 housing units.

History
Richland Township was organized in 1838.

Geography
The streams of Boot Run, Redkey Run and Thong Run run through this township.

Cities and towns
 Dunkirk (vast majority)
 Redkey

Adjacent townships
 Knox Township (north)
 Greene Township (northeast)
 Jefferson Township (east)
 Green Township, Randolph County (south)
 Delaware Township, Delaware County (southwest)
 Niles Township, Delaware County (west)
 Jackson Township, Blackford County (northwest)

Cemeteries
The township contains one cemetery, Hillcrest.

Major highways

References
 U.S. Board on Geographic Names (GNIS)
 United States Census Bureau cartographic boundary files

External links
 Indiana Township Association
 United Township Association of Indiana

Townships in Jay County, Indiana
Townships in Indiana